Fabrice Walfisch (born 9 February 1973) is a French racing driver.

Racing record

Complete International Formula 3000 results
(key) (Races in bold indicate pole position; races in italics indicate fastest lap.)

References

1973 births
Living people
French racing drivers
French Formula Three Championship drivers
International Formula 3000 drivers
Eurocup Mégane Trophy drivers
Porsche Supercup drivers

Team Astromega drivers
Draco Racing drivers
Nordic Racing drivers
Scuderia Coloni drivers